2-Mercaptoethanol (also β-mercaptoethanol, BME, 2BME, 2-ME or β-met) is the chemical compound with the formula HOCH2CH2SH. ME or βME, as it is commonly abbreviated, is used to reduce disulfide bonds and can act as a biological antioxidant by scavenging hydroxyl radicals (amongst others).  It is widely used because the hydroxyl group confers solubility in water and lowers the volatility.  Due to its diminished vapor pressure, its odor, while unpleasant, is less objectionable than related thiols.

Production
2-Mercaptoethanol is manufactured industrially by the reaction of ethylene oxide with hydrogen sulfide. Thiodiglycol and various zeolites catalyze the reaction.

Reactions
2-Mercaptoethanol reacts with aldehydes and ketones to give the corresponding oxathiolanes. This makes 2-mercaptoethanol useful as  a protecting group, giving a derivative whose stability is between that of a dioxolane and a dithiolane.

Applications

Reducing proteins
Some proteins can be denatured by 2-mercaptoethanol, which cleaves the disulfide bonds that may form between thiol groups of cysteine residues. In the case of excess 2-mercaptoethanol, the following equilibrium is shifted to the right:

 RS–SR + 2 HOCH2CH2SH  2 RSH + HOCH2CH2S–SCH2CH2OH

By breaking the S-S bonds, both the tertiary structure and the quaternary structure of some proteins can be disrupted. Because of its ability to disrupt the structure of proteins, it was used in the analysis of proteins, for instance, to ensure that a protein solution contains monomeric protein molecules, instead of disulfide linked dimers or higher order oligomers. However, since 2-mercaptoethanol forms adducts with free cysteines and is somewhat more toxic, dithiothreitol (DTT) is generally more used especially in SDS-PAGE.  DTT is also a more powerful reducing agent with a redox potential (at pH 7) of −0.33 V, compared to −0.26 V for 2-mercaptoethanol.

2-Mercaptoethanol is often used interchangeably with dithiothreitol (DTT) or the odorless tris(2-carboxyethyl)phosphine (TCEP) in biological applications.

Although 2-mercaptoethanol has a higher volatility than DTT, it is more stable: 2-mercaptoethanol's half-life is more than 100 hours at pH 6.5 and 4 hours at pH 8.5; DTT's half-life is 40 hours at pH 6.5 and 1.5 hours at pH 8.5.

Preventing protein oxidation
2-Mercaptoethanol and related reducing agents (e.g., DTT) are often included in enzymatic reactions to inhibit the oxidation of free sulfhydryl residues, and hence maintain protein activity. It is often used in enzyme assays as a standard buffer component.

Denaturing ribonucleases
2-Mercaptoethanol is used in some RNA isolation procedures to eliminate ribonuclease released during cell lysis. Numerous disulfide bonds make ribonucleases very stable enzymes, so 2-mercaptoethanol is used to reduce these disulfide bonds and irreversibly denature the proteins. This prevents them from digesting the RNA during its extraction procedure.

Deprotecting carbamates
Some carbamate protecting groups such as carboxybenzyl (Cbz) or allyloxycarbonyl (alloc) can be deprotected using 2-mercaptoethanol in the presence of potassium phosphate in dimethylacetamide.

Safety
2-Mercaptoethanol is considered toxic, causing irritation to the nasal passageways and respiratory tract upon inhalation, irritation to the skin, vomiting and stomach pain through ingestion, and potentially death if severe exposure occurs.

See also
 Dithiothreitol (DTT)
 TCEP

References

Thiols
Primary alcohols
Reducing agents
Foul-smelling chemicals